Karaidel (Qariźel) is a rural locality (a selo) and the administrative center of Karaidelsky District in the Republic of Bashkortostan, Russia, located on the Ufa River. Population:

References

Notes

Sources

Rural localities in Karaidelsky District